Jana Bobošíková (born 29 August 1964) is a Czech politician. In the 2004 European Parliament election she was elected a Member of the European Parliament for the Independent Democrats and remained unaffiliated in the European Parliament. In the 2008 and 2013 presidential elections she unsuccessfully ran for the office as President of the Czech Republic. She founded Politika 21 in 2006 and the Suverenita party in 2009.

Early life 
She was a member of the Socialist Union of Youth. In 2012, Czech media noticed that in a TV news report from June 1986, she passed a bouquet of roses to President Gustáv Husák, the Secretary-General of the Communist Party of Czechoslovakia. She later told Czech Television that it had been "an honor".

In 1987 she graduated with a master's degree in economics.

Career
From 1989, Bobošíková presented TV programmes on politics and economics, spending most of her television career at Ceska Televize (CT). She was appointed Head of News in late 2000, and played a significant role in the Czech TV crisis of January 2001, following which she resigned from CT and moved to TV Nova, where she worked until 2004.

She had already acted as Adviser to the Chairman of the Chamber of Deputies of the Parliament of the Czech Republic from 1999, and in 2004 continued her move into politics by standing for the European Parliament, elected on Vladimír Železný's Independent Democrats ticket. She was a Member of the European Parliament (MEP) until 2009. She sat on the Committee on Regional Development, was a substitute for the Committee on Economic and Monetary Affairs, and a member of the Delegation to the EU-Ukraine Parliamentary Cooperation Committee.

In 2009, after finishing her term as an MEP, she established her own party, Sovereignty. Bobošíková presented her candidacy in 2008 and 2013, for the President of the Czech Republic. In the 1st round of the 2013 election, she placed 9th with 2.39% (123,171 votes), and did not qualify for the second round.

References

Notes

External links

 
 Official YouTube Channel of Jana Bobošíková
 Suverenita's Web page
 Jana Bobošíková passing a bouquet of roses to Secretary General of KSČ comrade Gustáv Husák.
 
 

1964 births
Living people
Independent Democrats (Czech Republic) MEPs
MEPs for the Czech Republic 2004–2009
Women MEPs for the Czech Republic
Prague University of Economics and Business alumni
Politicians from Prague
Leaders of political parties
Czech eurosceptics
Anti-Islam sentiment in Europe
Candidates in the 2008 Czech presidential election
Candidates in the 2013 Czech presidential election
Communist Party of Bohemia and Moravia presidential candidates
Female candidates for President of the Czech Republic